For the 1970 Vuelta a España, the field consisted of 109 riders; 59 finished the race.

By rider

By nationality

References

1970 Vuelta a España
1970